Josi is a surname. Notable people with the surname include:

Christiaan Josi (1768–1828), Dutch engraver and art dealer
Erwin Josi (born 1955), Swiss alpine skier
Roman Josi (born 1990), Swiss ice hockey player

See also
Josh
Josi (given name)